is a former Japanese football player.

Playing career
Sato was born in Saitama Prefecture on August 16, 1971. After graduating from high school, he joined Japan Soccer League club Hitachi (later Kashiwa Reysol) in 1990. In 1992, Japan Soccer League was folded and the club joined new league, Japan Football League. In 1994, the club won the 2nd place and was promoted to J1 League. Although he played as goalkeeper for the club in 14 seasons, he could hardly play in the match behind Yoichi Doi and Yuta Minami. He retired end of 2003 season.

Club statistics

References

External links

Kashiwa Reysol

1971 births
Living people
Association football people from Saitama Prefecture
Japanese footballers
Japan Soccer League players
J1 League players
Japan Football League (1992–1998) players
Kashiwa Reysol players
Association football goalkeepers